Okatoma Creek is a tributary of the Bouie River in the U.S. state of Mississippi. It is part of the watershed of the Pascagoula River.

Okatoma Creek is popular for canoeing and kayaking particularly near Seminary, Mississippi, where there are several boat rental businesses. While a far cry from being a challenge to the highly-experienced canoeist, it offers several Class I falls and shoots. It makes for a half-day or full-day trip and can be done comfortably in early spring or late autumn.

The Okatoma Creek (sometimes referred to as the Okatoma River) is known for canoeing, picnicking, and camping. The creek offers many flat spots, is easy to paddle, and boats can be ported past the whitewater when needed. Below each of the whitewater areas, and in other spots along the way, there are beaches for swimming. (There are even a few rope swings along the way.)

Name
Okatoma is a name derived from the Choctaw language purported to mean either (sources vary) "radiant water" or "foggy water".

Variant names include "Lawsons Creek", "Oakatoma Creek", "Ocatona Creek", "Oka Toma Creek", "Okatoma River", "Okatomy Creek", "Okatona Creek", and "Sun Creek".

See also
List of rivers of Mississippi

Notes

References

External links 
Waterdata

Landforms of Covington County, Mississippi
Landforms of Forrest County, Mississippi
Rivers of Mississippi
Landforms of Simpson County, Mississippi
Landforms of Smith County, Mississippi
Mississippi placenames of Native American origin